is the second album by Japanese folk rock band Happy End, released on URC Records in 1971. In this concept album, Happy End attempted to paint a musical picture of Tokyo before the 1964 Summer Olympics, through which sweeping changes transformed the city forever.

Background and release
OK Music's Naoto Kawasaki notes how Eiichi Ohtaki and Shigeru Suzuki did not contribute to "Kaze wo Atsumete", with Haruomi Hosono playing the bass, guitar and organ and providing its vocals while Takashi Matsumoto plays the drums. Suzuki is also absent from "Kurayamizaka Musasabi Henge", which Kawasaki felt was inspired by the Nitty Gritty Dirt Band.

Bannai Tarao, a fictional detective who has appeared in many Japanese crime thrillers, is credited on several of the album's songs. Ohtaki even opens "Haikara Hakuchi" by saying, in English, "Hi, this is Bannai Tarao. Haikara (lit. "High-collar " or "Western fashion") is... Beautiful." This song was the B-side to Happy End's single "Juuni Gatsu no Ame no hi" off their first album, though this album version is different.

Matsumoto thought "Hana Ichi Monme" was a representative song of Happy End, and it was released as a single. Its B-side was "Natsu Nandesu", which Ben Sisario of The New York Times described in 2017 as having "echoes of Neil Young."

Kawasaki believes the ending of "Haru Ranman", with its uncredited banjo, mimics the end of Buffalo Springfield's 1967 song "Bluebird".

"Aiueo", the album's last song, is a 30-second fragment in which Ohtaki sings the gojūon, accompanied only by his acoustic guitar. The song's title is a pun: "aiueo" is the order of pronunciation in Japanese, while ai ue  translates as "love hunger".

Seven bonus tracks were added when the album was included in the March 31, 2004 Happy End Box set.

Reception and legacy

There were highly publicized debates held between prominent figures in the Japanese rock industry, most notably the members of Happy End and Yuya Uchida, regarding whether rock music sung entirely in Japanese was sustainable. Previously, almost all popular rock music in Japan was sung in English. The success of Happy End's first two albums proved the sustainability of Japanese-language rock.

In September 2007, Rolling Stone Japan ranked Kazemachi Roman No.1 on its list of the "100 Greatest Japanese Rock Albums of All Time". It was named number 15 on Bounces 2009 list of 54 Standard Japanese Rock Albums. In 2016, the album topped the list of 30 Best Japanese Albums of All Time published by beehype magazine.

"Aiueo" was covered by Pizzicato Five as the final track on their last album, 2001's Çà et là du Japon.

Two songs from the album were used in American films which had Brian Reitzell acting as music supervisor. In 2003, "Kaze wo Atsumete" was featured in Lost in Translation as well as on its soundtrack. In 2008, "Haikara Hakuchi" was featured in The Brothers Bloom.

"Sorairo no Crayon" was covered by thrash metal band Outrage for their 2015 album Genesis I.

"Hana Ichi Monme" was covered by Rolly for his 2015 cover album Rolly's Rock Circus.

"Kaze wo Atsumete" was covered by Mayu, Manaka and Asahi from Little Glee Monster for the 2021 Takashi Matsumoto tribute album Take Me to Kazemachi!.

Track listing

Personnel
Haruomi Hosono - bass on tracks 1-5, 7-11, piano on tracks 1, 2, 8, 9, organ on tracks 1, 3, 7, 8, vocals on tracks 3, 4, 7, 9, acoustic guitar on tracks 3, 4, 7, 11, claves on track 5, cowbell on track 6, chorus on tracks 5, 7, 11, flat mandolin on track 4 as 
Eiichi Ohtaki - acoustic guitar on tracks 1, 2, 11, 12, vocals on tracks 1, 2, 5, 10-12, electric guitar on track 5, slide guitar on track 6, güiro on track 5, chimes on track 5, chorus on tracks 1, 2, 4, 5, 8, 9, 11
Shigeru Suzuki - electric guitar on tracks 1, 5, 7-11, acoustic guitar on track 11, vocals on track 8, cowbell on track 5, chorus on tracks 1 & 5, slide guitar on track 6 as 
Takashi Matsumoto - drums on all tracks except 6 & 12, taiko on track 6, congas on track 5, cowbell on track 5, chorus on track 1
Shiba - mouth harp on tracks 10, 11
Komazawa - steel guitar on track 2

References

External links 
Pictures of the book art accompanying Kazemachi Roman

1971 albums
Happy End (band) albums
Japanese-language albums
Albums produced by Haruomi Hosono
Albums produced by Takashi Matsumoto (lyricist)
Concept albums